is a Japanese politician who served as mayor of Kobe, the capital city of Hyōgo Prefecture, Japan. He served as the mayor of the city from 1989 until 2001. He was also the mayor when the Great Hanshin earthquake struck Kobe in 1995.

References 

1924 births
2011 deaths
Japanese politicians
Mayors of places in Japan
People from Kagoshima Prefecture
People from Kobe
Politicians from Hyōgo Prefecture
Politicians from Kagoshima Prefecture